The Baltic Exchange (incorporated as The Baltic Exchange Limited) is a membership organisation for the maritime industry, and freight market information provider for the trading and settlement of physical and derivative contracts. It was located at 24–28 St Mary Axe, London, until the building was destroyed by a bomb in 1992. The Baltic Exchange moved into a new building at 38 St Mary Axe on 15 May 1995. It is now located at 107 Leadenhall St and has further offices in Europe, across Asia, and in the United States.

Overview 

Its international community of 650 member companies encompasses the majority of world shipping interests and commits to a code of business conduct overseen by the Baltic. Baltic Exchange members are responsible for a large proportion of all dry cargo and tanker fixtures as well as the sale and purchase of merchant vessels.

The Baltic Exchange traces its roots back to 1744 and the Virginia and Baltick Coffee House in Threadneedle Street. (English coffeehouses in the 17th and 18th centuries were important places for merchants and captains to exchange news.) It was incorporated as a private limited company with shares owned by its members on 17 January 1900.  In November 2016, the Singapore Exchange (SGX) acquired the Baltic Exchange. It remains headquartered in London.

The exchange provides daily freight market prices and maritime shipping cost indices which are used to guide freight traders as to the current level of various global shipping markets, as well as being used to set freight contract rates and settle freight futures (known as forward freight agreements or FFAs). Originally operating a trading floor, the exchange's members' transactions are today mainly conducted by telephone.

The exchange is the source of market-wide information and publishes seven daily indices made up from a suite of wet and dry bench-marked time-charter and voyage routes:
 Baltic Dry Index (BDI)
 Baltic Panamax Index (BPI)
 Baltic Capesize Index (BCI)
 Baltic Supramax Index (BSI)
 Baltic Handysize Index (BHSI)
 Baltic Dirty Tanker Index (BDTI)
 Baltic Clean Tanker Index (BCTI)
 Baltic LNG Tanker Index (BLNG)

In April 2018, the Baltic Exchange announced a global container index called the Freightos Baltic Index (FBX) in partnership with Freightos. Liquified Natural Gas (LNG) assessments launched in 2019.

The exchange also provides forward curves, a dry cargo fixture list, sale and purchase values, LPG & LNG assessments, daily market news, and the market settlement data for freight derivative contracts.

Current management
As of 2019, the current management includes:
 Chief Executive: Mark Jackson
 Chairman, Baltic Exchange Council: Denis Petropolous
 Chief Financial Officer and company secretary: Mark Read
 Chief Commercial Officer: Janet Sykes
 Communications: Bill Lines

BIFFEX
BIFFEX, the Baltic International Freight Futures Exchange, was a London-based exchange for trading ocean freight futures contracts with settlement based on the Baltic Freight Index. It started trading dry cargo freight futures contracts in 1985, and was modestly successful for some years. All contracts were cleared by the ICCH (International Commodity Clearing House), later renamed LCH.Clearnet (London Clearing House). A tanker freight futures contract was introduced in 1986, but never became popular and was suspended indefinitely the same year. Volumes in the dry cargo contracts dwindled over the years, and the contracts ceased trading due to lack of liquidity in 2001.

Premises
The exchange was located at 24–28 St Mary Axe in the City of London until it was destroyed in a 1992 bomb.

The grandeur of the original building can be appreciated in an engraving by Finnemore from 1918.

It is now located at 107 Leadenhall St, London. It has further offices in Europe, Asia, and the United States.

Notes

References

External links
 Official web site, www.balticexchange.com

Service companies of the United Kingdom
Economy of London
Ship management
Futures exchanges
Commodity markets in the United Kingdom
1744 establishments in Great Britain